Shamsher Khan (1933 – 15 October 2017) was an Indian swimmer who represented India in the 1956 Summer Olympics.
In 1954, he made a national record in the 200-meter butterfly event. He broke the existing national record at the national meet in Bangalore in 1955.

Shamsher Khan was in the Indian Army and also participated in the Indo-China war in 1962 and the war with Pakistan in 1971. He retired from the Indian Army in 1973 with the Subedar rank.

References

External links
 

1933 births
2017 deaths
Indian male swimmers
Male breaststroke swimmers
Swimmers at the 1956 Summer Olympics
Olympic swimmers of India
People from Guntur district
Swimmers from Andhra Pradesh
20th-century Indian people
21st-century Indian people